Walter (Walther) Rauff (19 June 1906 – 14 May 1984) was a mid-ranking SS commander in Nazi Germany. From January 1938, he was an aide of Reinhard Heydrich firstly in the Security Service (Sicherheitsdienst or SD), later in the Reich Security Main Office. He worked for the Federal Intelligence Service of West Germany (Bundesnachrichtendienst) between 1958 and 1962, and was subsequently employed by the Mossad, the Israeli secret service. His funeral in Santiago, Chile, was attended by several former Nazis.

Rauff is thought to have been responsible for nearly 100,000 deaths during World War II. He was instrumental in the implementation of the Nazis' genocide by mobile gas chamber. His victims included Communists, Jews, Roma and people with disabilities. He was arrested in 1945, but subsequently escaped and was never brought to trial. In the late 1970s and the 1980s, he was arguably the most wanted Nazi fugitive still alive.

From the Navy to the SS
According to the MI5 file on Walter Rauff released in 2005:

Rauff joined the Kriegsmarine (the German Navy) in 1924 as a young cadet. After a period of training as a midshipman he was promoted to Lieutenant in 1936 and given command of a minesweeper. He was a friend of Reinhard Heydrich, who also served in the Navy in the 1920s. Heydrich was hired by SS chief Heinrich Himmler in 1931 to serve as the head of the SS counter-intelligence system, and when Rauff resigned from the Navy in 1937, Heydrich took him under his wing. Rauff was given the job of putting the SS and its security service, the Sicherheitsdienst, onto a war footing.

During his thirteen years in the Navy, Rauff became acquainted with Reinhard Heydrich and saw service in South America and Spain as a young officer in 1924.

In 1937, Rauff left the Navy following an adultery scandal, but he was discharged "with all honours", as he said in a 1972 deposition before a German prosecutor in Santiago de Chile.

Between 1940 and 1941, Rauff returned to the Navy as a volunteer, commanding a mine sweeper flotilla in the English Channel. He was promoted to Lieutenant Commander (Korvettenkapitän) in April 1941, shortly before he was discharged from active service, he then returned to the Reich Security Main Office. During early 1940, he headed the SD in German-occupied Norway for few months.

Gas van engineering

In 1941 and 1942, Rauff was involved in the development of gas vans, mobile gas chambers used to kill, by poisoning or suffocation, those people deemed enemies of the German state: Jews, disabled people, communists and others. According to declassified CIA documents:

As an official of the Criminal Technical Institute of the Reich Security Main Office, Rauff designed gas vans used to murder Jews and persons with disabilities.

The MI5 file is more explicit concerning Rauff's "technical" skills:

Rauff supervised the modification of scores of trucks, with the assistance of a Berlin chassis builder, to divert their exhaust fumes into airtight chambers in the back of the vehicles. The victims were then poisoned and/or asphyxiated from the carbon monoxide accumulating within the truck compartment as the vehicle travelled to a burial site. The trucks could carry between 25 and 60 people at a time.

In 1972, in Santiago de Chile, Rauff made a deposition as a witness before a German prosecutor. On the subject of the extermination of Jews in Poland and Russia, asked whether at that time he had any doubts concerning the use of gas vans, Rauff answered:

Rauff delegated the task of keeping the gas vans operating in the Soviet Union and other Nazi-occupied areas to an SS chemist, August Becker, who kept Rauff fully informed on the gas van killing operations.

Persecution in Vichy-North Africa
Rauff was later involved in the persecution of Jews in Vichy France-controlled Tunisia during 1942 and 1943, by implementing the antisemitic Statute of the Jews enacted by pro-Nazi metropolitan Vichy state. A month after German Field Marshal Erwin Rommel's defeat of the British at Tobruk in June 1942, the SS set up a special extermination unit to follow in the wake of Rommel's Afrika Korps. The unit, commanded by Rauff, was empowered to carry out "executive measures on the civilian population", the Nazi euphemism for mass murder and enslavement.  However, his mission to exterminate the Middle East's Jewish population was brought to an abrupt halt when the British 8th Army defeated Rommel at El Alamein in October 1942. Rommel was forced to withdraw the remnants of his army to Tunisia, where it sustained a bridgehead until May 1943, enabling Rauff's SS to start lower scale persecutions of local Jews. The MI5 file records that Rauff was posted to Vichy-Tunisia in 1942 as head of the Security Service (SD), where he led a mobile killing squad (Einsatzkommando) which conducted a "well-organised persecution campaign against the Jews and partisans".

During this time, the Jewish community was particularly hard hit. More than 2,500 Jews in Nazi-occupied Tunisia died in a network of SS slave labour camps before the Germans withdrew. Rauff's men also stole jewels, silver, gold and religious Jewish artifacts. Forty-three kilogrammes of gold were taken from the Jewish community on the island of Djerba alone.

Chief of the secret police in Northern Italy
In 1943, Rauff was sent to Milan where he took charge of all Gestapo and SD operations throughout northwest Italy. The MI5 file states:
 
In both these postings [Tunisia and northern Italy] Rauff rapidly gained a reputation for utter ruthlessness. In Tunis and Italy he was responsible for the indiscriminate execution of both Jews and local partisans. His work in Italy involved imposing total German control on Milan, Turin and Genoa. His success in this task earned him the congratulations of his SS superior, who described it as 'a superb achievement'.

Rauff remained in Italy until the end of the war. The MI5 file states:

He narrowly avoided being lynched by an Italian mob, having barricaded himself and a number of other SS officers into the Hotel Regina in Milan. He was arrested by Allied troops and sent to a prisoner of war camp.

His interrogator in the POW camp ended his report with these words:

Rauff has brought his organisation of political gangsterism to stream-lined perfection and is proud of the fact. By nature cynical and overbearing, but cunning and shifty rather than intelligent, he regards his past activities as a matter of course.

According to Rauff's declassified CIA file:

Near the end of the war Rauff, then the senior SS and police official in northern Italy, tried to gain credit for the surrender of German forces in Italy, but ended up only surrendering himself. After escaping from an American internment camp in Rimini, Rauff hid in a number of Italian convents, apparently under the protection of Bishop Alois Hudal.

Spying activities in the Middle East
In 1948, he was recruited by Syrian intelligence and went to Damascus, where he served as military adviser to President Husni al-Za'im when they fought against the newly established State of Israel, only to fall out of favour after a coup a year later. Rauff managed to convince his captors that he was only an adviser and had no command powers; he was released but ordered to leave the country. After barely escaping from Syria, Rauff fled to Lebanon and later back to Italy, and gained a transit pass for Ecuador, where he and his family settled, later moving to Chile.

Before sailing for Ecuador in December 1949, Rauff is said to have worked for a while for Israeli intelligence before Mossad was formed. The 2007 book, On the Trail of Nazi War Criminals Who Weren’t Punished by Mossad operative Yossi Chen (Chinitz), indicates that Rauff provided intelligence from Syria and was handled by Shalhevet Freier, of the Foreign Ministry. Rauff was paid for this work. 

A CIA report, dated 24 March 1950, states that Israeli agent Edmond (Ted) Cross of the Israeli Service was working to employ former Nazis for observation and penetration in the Arab countries. One of the plans included sending Rauff to Egypt. One report indicated that Rauff did not reach Egypt, but a 1953 memo stated that an operative, most likely Rauff, was in the country at that time. An earlier CIA report, from February 1950, stated that Cross helped Rauff obtain the necessary papers for settling in South America (entering by Argentina) and added: "It is not improbable that Subject's presence in Syria was in connection with a mission for the Israel[i] service". Rauff was working in Syria, as an advisor to President Hosni Zaim, but left the country after Zaim was deposed.

Final refuge in Chile
 
After settling in Chile in 1958, Rauff worked as the manager of a king crab cannery in Punta Arenas, one of the southernmost towns in the world. He was also a merchant in Quito, Ecuador.

From 1958 to 1963, Rauff worked for the Federal Intelligence Service of West Germany (Bundesnachrichtendienst or BND), and earned 70,000 DM from the agency.  To cover up his South-American spy activity, he acted as export manager and agent for Importadora Goldmann, a company in Santiago de Chile. His contact was Wilhelm Beissner, aka Bertram, a paymaster for BND, who knew Rauff since the time when both of them were employed in the Reich Security Main Office. He was warned (and removed from the BND) before his detention in Chile. Nevertheless, he was able to partially recover the lawyer's fees from the BND for an amount of 3,200 DM. He was also given 15,000 DM for the start-up of a new company. Initially the recruitment of the well-travelled Rauff seemed promising. Instead his reports turned out to be worthless for the most part. Rauff was dismissed from the BND in October 1962, although some lines of communication remained open until July 1963.

He was evaluated as "untrustworthy" (charakterlich äußerst unzuverlässig), "intriguer" (er konspirierte nach allen Seiten), and "drunkard" (eng mit dem Alkohol befreundet).

In 1960, he visited Germany in order to claim his pension for the time which he had served in the Reichsmarine, and he had no trouble with the German authorities.
In December 1962, he was arrested by Chilean authorities after Germany requested his extradition, but he was freed by a Chilean Supreme Court decision five months later in 1963 on the grounds that his crimes had been committed too long ago. Salvador Allende's election as Chilean president in 1970 did not change the situation. In a friendly letter to Nazi hunter Simon Wiesenthal, Allende wrote that he could not reverse the Supreme Court's 1963 decision. 

Former Mossad operative Yossi Chen (Chinitz) relates in his book that the agency attempted to capture Rauff in 1979, even visiting him at his home. The plan was to assassinate him and then issue a press release stating: "Today in Chile, we executed one of the greatest Nazi war criminals – commander of the Gestapo’s technical department who developed and directed the mobile gas vans in which more than 100,000 Jews were exterminated. We are a group of those who will never forget the Nazis’ crimes so we decided, in the name of justice, to execute him". This plan failed.

When Hans Strack, the German ambassador to Chile, was ordered to request his extradition, Strack, a supporter of exiled war criminals, forwarded the application for Rauff's extradition over 14 months later. The delay allowed Chile to refuse the extradition request because the length of time elapsed since his crimes overran the country's statute of limitations.

 Allegedly, CIA officials could not determine Rauff's exact position. Pinochet's regime resisted all calls for his extradition to stand trial in either West Germany or Israel. In the meantime, Rauff disappeared and was discovered by the documentary filmmaker William Bemister in Los Pozos, Santiago de Chile, in 1979, and interviewed.

The last request to extradite Rauff to West Germany was presented by renowned Nazi hunter Beate Klarsfeld in 1983, but it was rejected by the Pinochet regime, which alleged that Rauff had been a peaceful Chilean citizen for over twenty years and stated that the case was closed since the Supreme Court's 1963 decision. Klarsfeld organised protests in Chile and was twice arrested for causing disturbances. Following her brief detention, the director-general of Israel's Ministry of Foreign Affairs, David Kimche, officially requested Rauff's expulsion in a meeting with Chilean Foreign Minister Jaime del Valle, but the request was turned down.

Death
Suffering from lung cancer, Rauff died in Santiago on 14 May 1984 from a heart attack. His funeral was the occasion of a Nazi celebration.  According to his MI5 file, "he never showed any remorse for his actions, which he described as those of "a mere technical administrator".
A German-language biography of Rauff written by Martin Cüppers was published in 2013.

See also 
List of Nazi Party leaders and officials
Denazification
Nuremberg Trials

References

Citations

Bibliography
 
  See also USHMM.

External links 
 Nazi War Crimes and Japanese Imperial Government Records Interagency Working Group", Walter Rauff", Disclosure, Nov 2002.
 Shraga Elam and Dennis Whitehead, "Rauff vs. the Yishuv", Ha'aretz, 7 April 2007.
 Security Service - MI5, "5 September 2005 releases: German intelligence officers", file ref. KV /1970a, "Walter Rauff".
 Jan Friedmann, "New Research Taints Image of Desert Fox Rommel", Der Spiegel Online, May 23, 2007.

1906 births
1984 deaths
People from Köthen (Anhalt)
Nazi Party politicians
Nazi Party officials
People of the Federal Intelligence Service
Einsatzgruppen personnel
SS-Standartenführer
Nazis in South America
German expatriates in Chile
People from the Duchy of Anhalt
Reichsmarine personnel
Reich Security Main Office personnel
Holocaust perpetrators in Tunisia
Federal Intelligence Service informants
People of the Mossad